Bobone is an old, heavily eroded crater formation that lies on the far side of the Moon. Little remains of the original crater formation, leaving only a bowl-shaped depression in the surface that is pock-marked by tiny craterlets. It is attached to the southwest rim of the large satellite crater Kovalevskaya Q, which has its northeast rim overlaid by Kovalevskaya itself. To the west-southwest is Bronk.

References

 
 
 
 
 
 
 
 
 
 
 
 

Impact craters on the Moon